Harry Van Arsdale Jr. (November 23, 1905 – February 16, 1986) was a labor and community leader in New York City. His father was a union electrician.

Van Arsdale was descendant from 17th century Dutch immigrants to New York and a descendant of John Van Arsdale, a Colonial army veteran of the American Revolutionary War, who climbed up a greased flagpole to retrieve a Union Jack flag which still flew during the evacuation of the British from New York. Van Arsdale was also related to noted historian James Riker.

At the age of 28 he rose to the leadership of Union Local 3 of the IBEW, a labor union for electricians. He eventually served as a leader of the Building Trades Council in New York City, and was the first President of the New York City Central Labor Council (NYCCLC) AFL-CIO in New York City. He held this post from its formation in 1958 until his death in 1986. He was also a civil rights leader who met with Dr. Martin Luther King Jr.

During Van Arsdale's tenure as Business Manager of his union and the NYCCLC, he introduced employer-funded pension systems in the building trades and created a community for electrical workers and their families to live called Electchester in Queens, New York. He also was responsible for the organization of the taxi drivers in New York City and was a driving force in organizing hospital workers in the city.  The hospital workers union, SEIU 1199, later became one of the single largest unions in the city with over 100,000 members.

Today the New York City Central Labor Council (NYCCLC) is the largest local labor membership organization under the direction of the national AFL-CIO. Founded in 1959 the NYCCLC represents over 400 local New York City unions in both the public and private sectors of the New York economy.

The New York City Central Labor Council is a non-profit labor membership organization devoted to supporting, advancing and advocating for its member organizations and all 'working class' people of New York City. Of the 11 million total workers represented by the AFL-CIO, the New York City Central Labor Council alone represents close to 15% of its total membership.

References

1905 births
1986 deaths
American people of Dutch descent
Activists from New York City
American trade unionists